Holton High School is a public high school in Holton, Kansas, United States, operated by Holton USD 336 school district, and serves students of 9 to 12.  The school's mascot is a wildcat and the school's colors are blue and white. Rod Wittmer is the school's current principal and about 304 students are enrolled in grades 9-12.

History
Holton High School had its first graduating class in 1881.
The current Holton High School site was originally home to Campbell College from its opening in 1880, to its merger with Lane University in 1902, until 1913, when it was relocated to Kansas City and merged with Kansas City University. Following the merge, the campus became part of the Holton School District. The college's main building which was torn down, and replaced with a newly-constructed high school.

The high school was grouped as part of the Holton USD 336 public school district, c. 1965.

The school was renovated in 1994 where the gymnasium was temporarily divided up into classrooms.  A new recessed gymnasium was later built, with the original school gym converted to a library.  Other renovations included a video lab which produced programs for their public access channel.

In 2015, Holton held its 135th commencement exercises where they graduated 80 seniors.

Notable alumni
 Lynn Jenkins (graduated 1981) - U.S. Representative 
 Matt Mattox (graduated 2000) - football coach
 Pat Roberts (graduated 1954) - U.S. Senator

See also
 List of high schools in Kansas
 List of unified school districts in Kansas

References

School website
 
 Holton High School profile with U.S. News & World Report

Public high schools in Kansas
Schools in Jackson County, Kansas
1881 establishments in Kansas
Educational institutions established in 1981